The 2006 FIA GT Budapest 500 km was the eighth race for the 2006 FIA GT Championship season.  It took place on September 30, 2006, being run at the Hungaroring.

Official results

Class winners in bold.  Cars failing to complete 70% of winner's distance marked as Not Classified (NC).

Statistics
 Pole Position – #9 Zakspeed Racing – 1:42.034
 Average Speed – 147.6 km/h

External links
 Official Results

Budapest
FIA GT
Budapest